Sydney van Hooijdonk (born 6 February 2000) is a Dutch professional footballer who plays as a centre forward for Eredivisie club Heerenveen, on loan from Serie A club Bologna.

Club career

NAC Breda
Van Hooijdonk made his league debut for NAC Breda on 5 October 2018 in a 2-1 away defeat against FC Utrecht in the Eredivisie, being substituted on in the 90th Minute, replacing Estonian centre back and defensive midfielder, Karol Mets. NAC Breda's 2018-19 campaign ended in relegation from the top-flight, securing only 5 wins and 8 draws, and finishing on 23 points. They were officially relegated to the Keuken Kampioen Divisie, following a 2-1 away defeat against SC Heerenveen on 12 May 2019, after failing to qualify for the 2018-19 Eredivisie / Keuken Kampioen Divisie Promotion / Relegation play-offs. During that season, Van Hooijdonk made a total of 12 league appearances from the bench, but failed to score or set up any goals.

The 2019–20 Keuken Kampioen Divisie season saw Van Hooijdonk starting off the bench again, but he very quickly began playing full matches on a semi-regular basis, making 25 appearances, scoring 6 goals and assisting 2 others. A bulk of his goals and assists came during the 1st Period, and he was acclaimed with being a driving force towards NAC Breda winning it. However, the club couldn't utilize the playoff spot they'd won, as the season was abandoned by the KNVB on 24 April 2020, following a suspension that the Dutch Government issued on 12 March 2020 due to the global COVID-19 pandemic.

The 2020–21 Keuken Kampioen Divisie season saw Van Hooijdonk become a key player for NAC Breda despite suffering several minor injuries, securing 16 goals and 2 assists in 31 appearances (including those in the 2020-21 Eredivisie / Keuken Kampioen Divisie Promotion / Relegation play-offs, where his club were defeated in the Final in a 2-1 home defeat to NEC). Van Hooijdonk's contract was set to expire at the end of the 2020-21 season, and he was attracting End of Contract interest from clubs including Celtic and Nottingham Forest, likely due to these being clubs his father played at. However, perhaps due to new Work Permit rules issued by the Home Office in the United Kingdom following Brexit (which is points-based and calculated by several factors, such as Youth / Senior International Appearances, Club Ranking / League Standing and Club Appearances), these deals failed to materialize and he left NAC Breda at the end of the season, becoming a Free Agent.

Bologna
On 3 July 2021, he joined Serie A club Bologna on a Free Transfer, on a contract which could keep him at the club until the end of the 2024-25 season. The 2021–22 Serie A season saw Van Hooijdonk make only 4 appearances for his club (each appearance from the bench, and each resulting in no goals or assists).

Heerenveen (loan)
On 25 January 2022, he joined Eredivisie club Heerenveen on loan until the end of the 2021–22 season, despite initial reservations about returning to the Netherlands. The 2021–22 Eredivisie season saw Van Hooijdonk make a definite impact while on loan at Heerenveen, obtaining 6 goals and 1 assist in 13 appearances, and piquing the interest of Heerenveen's Technical Director, Ferry de Haan, who approached Bologna to enquire about his availability.

On 21 June 2022, it was reported that Bologna were considering adding players (including Van Hooijdonk) to a potential deal for FC Groningen's Norwegian forward, Jørgen Strand Larsen. Van Hooijdonk was quick to distance himself from the rumoured deal, likely due to the club being rivals with Heerenveen. On 30 June 2022, his loan contract with Heerenveen expired, and he returned to Bologna. On 25 July 2022, Van Hooijdonk returned to Heerenveen on loan until the end of the 2022-23 Eredivisie season. The 2022–23 Eredivisie season has currently saw Van Hooijdonk net 10 goals and 1 assists in 25 appearances.

Personal life
He is the son of former Dutch international footballer Pierre van Hooijdonk. He is of Moroccan descent through his biological paternal grandfather.

Career statistics

Club

Honours
Individual
Eredivisie Talent of the Month: April 2022

References

External links
 

Living people
2000 births
Footballers from Breda
Association football forwards
Dutch footballers
Dutch sportspeople of Moroccan descent
NAC Breda players
Bologna F.C. 1909 players
SC Heerenveen players
Eredivisie players
Eerste Divisie players
Serie A players
Dutch expatriate footballers
Expatriate footballers in Italy
Dutch expatriate sportspeople in Italy